Guillaume Cheval dit St-Jacques (April 17, 1828 – April 29, 1880) was a Quebec businessman and political figure. He represented Rouville in the House of Commons of Canada as a Liberal member from 1867 to 1872 and from 1874 to 1878.

He was born in Beloeil, Lower Canada in 1828, the son of Louis Cheval dit St-Jacques and Rosalie Cherrier (cousin of Louis-Joseph Papineau)  and educated at Saint-Denis. He served as mayor of Saint-Hilaire for four years. In 1852, he married Hermélimbe Richer. He died in Saint-Hilaire at the age of 52.

References 

1828 births
1880 deaths
Liberal Party of Canada MPs
Members of the House of Commons of Canada from Quebec
Mayors of places in Quebec